First Methodist Church is a historic church at 301 E. Courthouse in Cuero, Texas.

It was built in 1886 and added to the National Register of Historic Places in 1988.

See also

National Register of Historic Places listings in DeWitt County, Texas

References

External links

Methodist churches in Texas
Churches on the National Register of Historic Places in Texas
Gothic Revival church buildings in Texas
Churches completed in 1886
19th-century Methodist church buildings in the United States
Churches in DeWitt County, Texas
National Register of Historic Places in DeWitt County, Texas